Joseph Hodson Outhwaite (December 5, 1841 – December 9, 1907) was an American educator, lawyer and politician who served five terms as a U.S. Representative from Ohio from 1885 to 1895.

Early life and career 
Born in Cleveland, Ohio, Outhwaite attended the public schools of Zanesville, Ohio. He taught in Zanesville's high school from 1862 to 1864.
Outhwaite was principal of a grammar school in Columbus, Ohio from 1864 to 1867, studying law while teaching.

He was admitted to the bar in 1866 and practiced from 1867 to 1871 at Osceola, Missouri. He served as prosecuting attorney of Franklin County, Ohio from 1874 to 1878. Starting in 1879 he was trustee of the county children's home, continuing until he was appointed trustee of the fund of the city of Columbus in 1883, staying there until 1889.

Congress 
Outhwaite was elected as a Democrat to the Forty-ninth and to the four succeeding Congresses (March 4, 1885 – March 3, 1895). He served as chairman of the Committee on Pacific Railroads (Fiftieth Congress), Committee on Military Affairs (Fifty-second and Fifty-third Congresses).
He was appointed a member of the commission to codify the laws of the United States.

Later career and death 
Outhwaite was Dean of the law school at Ohio State University from 1904 until his death in Columbus on December 9, 1907. He is interred in Green Lawn Cemetery.

Sources

External links

1841 births
1907 deaths
Politicians from Cleveland
Politicians from Zanesville, Ohio
Politicians from Columbus, Ohio
Ohio State University faculty
Ohio State University trustees
Moritz College of Law faculty
County district attorneys in Ohio
Burials at Green Lawn Cemetery (Columbus, Ohio)
19th-century American politicians
Lawyers from Cleveland
Lawyers from Columbus, Ohio
Democratic Party members of the United States House of Representatives from Ohio